The 2016 South American Under-17 Women's Football Championship was the fifth edition of the South American Under-17 Women's Football Championship, the biennial international youth football championship organised by the CONMEBOL for the women's under-17 national teams of South America. The tournament was held in Barquisimeto, Venezuela between 1 and 20 March 2016.

Same as previous editions, the tournament acted as the CONMEBOL qualifiers for the FIFA U-17 Women's World Cup. The top three teams of the tournament qualified for the 2016 FIFA U-17 Women's World Cup in Jordan as the CONMEBOL representatives.

Venezuela were crowned champions for the second consecutive tournament, and qualified for the World Cup together with runners-up Brazil and third place Paraguay.

Teams
All ten CONMEBOL member national teams entered the tournament.

Venues
The tournament was played in Barquisimeto. The stadium was Deportivo Lara's Estadio Metropolitano de Fútbol de Lara.

Squads
Players born on or after 1 January 1999 were eligible to compete in the tournament. Each team could register a maximum of 22 players (three of whom must be goalkeepers).

First stage
The draw of the tournament was held on 27 January 2016 at the CONMEBOL Headquarters in Luque, Paraguay. The ten teams were drawn into two groups of five teams. Each group contained one team from each of the five "pairing pots": Venezuela–Brazil, Colombia–Paraguay, Argentina–Uruguay, Bolivia–Chile, Ecuador–Peru. The schedule of the tournament was announced on 18 February 2016.

The top two teams of each group advanced to the final stage. The teams were ranked according to points (3 points for a win, 1 point for a draw, 0 points for a loss). If tied on points, tiebreakers would be applied in the following order:
Goal difference in all games;
Goals scored in all games;
Head-to-head result in games between tied teams;
Penalty shoot-out if only two teams are tied on points and they are playing last game of the group
Drawing of lots.

All times were local, VET (UTC−4:30).

Group A

Group B

Final stage
If teams finished level of points, the final order would be determined according to the same criteria as the first stage, taking into account only matches in the final stage. If there was a continuing tie between teams after applying criteria 1–4, the first stage results would be taken into account.

Winners

Qualified teams for FIFA U-17 Women's World Cup
The following three teams from CONMEBOL qualified for the FIFA U-17 Women's World Cup.

1 Bold indicates champion for that year. Italic indicates host for that year.

Goalscorers
12 goals
 Deyna Castellanos

10 goals
 Jessica Martínez

6 goals
 Daniuska Rodríguez

5 goals
 Nycole Silva

4 goals
 Yerliane Moreno

3 goals
 Kerolin Nicoli

2 goals

 Bianca Ferrara
 Rosario Balmaceda
 Rachel Padrón
 Mairerth Pérez
 Dahiana Bogarín
 Katia Martínez
 Xioczana Canales
 Deyna Morales
 Jeismar Cabeza

1 goal

 Luana Muñoz
 Magalí Benítez
 Ana Vitória Araújo
 Angelina Alonso
 Isabela da Silva
 Rayane Souza
 Thais da Silva
 Camila Rapimán
 Laura Barreto
 Laura Chirva
 Manuela Vanegas
 Carmen Caicedo
 Doménica Rodríguez
 Gladys Trujillo
 Limpia Fretes
 Fabiola Sandoval
 Jessica Sánchez
 Flavia Castel
 Tamara García
 Belén Yuvet
 Olimar Castillo
 Sandra Luzardo

Own goal
 Manuela Vanegas (playing against Venezuela)

References

External links
Sudamericano Femenino Sub17 2016, CONMEBOL.com

2016
2016 in women's association football
International association football competitions hosted by Venezuela
Under-17 Women's Football Championship
2016 in Venezuelan women's sport
2016 in youth sport
2016 in youth association football
2016 in Venezuelan football